The Yema T80 is a compact crossover SUV produced by Chinese automaker Yema Auto since 2017. The Yema T80 debuted during the 2016 Chengdu Auto Show in China, and was launched in China in 7 March 2017.

Overview

The T80 stands on a slightly stretched variant of the same platform that also underpins the Yema T70, making the design also similar to the T70.

Engine options include a 150hp 1.5 liter turbo engine mated to a five-speed manual gearbox and a 218hp 2.0 liter turbo engine mated to a 6-speed DCT with front wheel drive only throughout the product line just like the T70.

Prices for the Yema T80 ranges from 89,800 yuan to 129,800 yuan.

References

External links

Yema T80 official site

T80
2010s cars
Front-wheel-drive vehicles
Cars introduced in 2016
Crossover sport utility vehicles
Compact sport utility vehicles
Cars of China